Piermaria Porettano (active 1600) was an Italian painter  of Bologna, who trained with Ludovico Carracci.

References

17th-century Italian painters
Italian male painters
Painters from Bologna
Italian Baroque painters
Year of death unknown
Year of birth unknown